Olympia Towers, is a proposed development consisting of a three-tower residential and retail complex in Downtown Los Angeles, California, immediately north of Crypto.com Arena, L.A. Live and the Los Angeles Convention Center.

The Olympia Towers development is currently proposed as three towers. Olympia Tower I is currently proposed as 65 floors of residential, Olympia Tower II as 53 and Olympia Tower III as 43. The site bordering the 110 Harbor Freeway is currently a parking lot.

See also
List of tallest buildings in Los Angeles

References

External links
Olympia Towers Los Angeles Website

Buildings and structures in Downtown Los Angeles
Proposed buildings and structures in California